George Brennan may refer to:

 George E. Brennan (died 1928), Democratic party boss in Illinois
 George Brennan (boxer) (born 1911), English boxer